The 2015 IAAF Hammer Throw Challenge was the sixth edition of the annual, global series of hammer throw competitions organised by the International Association of Athletics Federations. The winners were Paweł Fajdek (248.01 metres) and Anita Włodarczyk (235.28 metres), both of Poland. This was Włodarczyk's third straight title and Fajdek's second title, after his win in 2013. Fajdek and Włodarczyk each improved the challenge record totals. Włodarczyk twice broke the hammer throw world record that year, but these marks were achieved outside of the series.

A total of fourteen meetings featured on the circuit, with nine women's and ten men's contests spread across those events. The point scoring format was cumulative – the final standings were decided by the sum of athletes' three best throws on the circuit. Only the best throw by an athlete from each meet was taken into consideration.

Calendar
The 2015 series continued the model of the 2013 by featuring a combination of IAAF World Challenge meetings and non-IAAF meetings in Europe.

The IAAF Melbourne World Challenge became the first Oceanian leg to the series and made the series the longest yet, with its March date. The Brothers Znamensky Memorial and Meeting Grand Prix IAAF de Dakar returned to the series. Performances at the 2015 World Championships in Athletics also counted towards the series total, as they had in 2013. The Ponce Grand Prix de Atletismo, Meeting de Atletismo Madrid, and Moscow Challenge were all dropped from the schedule.

Final standings

Men
A total of ten men recorded valid marks at three or more meetings and made the final standings. Marks in bold are those which counted towards the final score.

Women
A total of fourteen women recorded valid marks at three or more meetings and made the final standings – a new high for the competition. Marks in bold are those which counted towards the final score.

See also
2015 IAAF Diamond League

References

2015
IAAF Hammer Throw Challenge